Kliplev Parish is a parish in the Diocese of Haderslev in Aabenraa Municipality, Denmark.

References

Parishes in Aabenraa Municipality
Parishes of Denmark